The Parc Natural dels Aiguamolls de l'Empordà is a natural park in Catalonia, Spain. It forms part of the Bay of Roses and, like the Ebro Delta, was a malarial swampland. The marshland lies between the Rivers Fluvià and Muga. It is the second largest wetland in Catalonia at over 4,800 hectares and was established in 1983.

During the 19th century, much of the marsh was drained as canals were created and the land converted to agriculture. However, virgin marsh and dunes remained and was given Natural Park status in the 1980s after a campaign to save the area from development.

The park accommodates 327 different species. Great spotted cuckoo, spoonbill, nightingale, collared pratincole and stone-curlew are among its many birds. The park offers seven hides and one tower for bird watchers. They are connected through a plain dirt track which allows wheelchairs.

The GR 92 long distance footpath, which roughly follows the length of the Mediterranean coast of Spain, passes through the park and has a staging point at the El Cortalet pond.

References

External links
 

Natural parks of Catalonia
Ramsar sites in Spain
Protected areas established in 1983